The African People's Socialist Party (APSP) is a pan-Africanist political party and organization working towards reparations for slavery in the United States, identifying ideologically with African internationalism and African socialism. The party was formed in May 1972 by the merger of three black power organizations based in Florida and Kentucky. Omali Yeshitela, one of the original co-founders, leads the APSP as of 2019.

The APSP's stated goals are "to keep the Black Power Movement alive, defend the countless Africans locked up by the counterinsurgency, and develop relationships with Africa and Africans worldwide".

History 
The African People's Socialist Party (APSP) was founded in 1972 — emerging from three earlier Black organizations in Florida, namely: the Junta of Militant Organizations (JOMO), the Black Rights Fighters, and the Black Study Group. JOMO, the most influential of the three organizations, was a Black organization led by Omali Yeshitela that protested against racial discrimination, police brutality, and abuses against people of African descent in Florida. Yeshitela founded APSP in 1972 and became its chairman. That same year, the APSP adopted the oldest black power newspaper in the U.S. — The Burning Spear Newspaper as its official publication. The APSP is an African internationalist and African socialist organization. According to historian Harvey Klehr, the APSP styles its members as "true, genuine communists." 

The APSP established the African People's Solidarity Committee (APSC) in 1976. The APSC is an European and European American organization "that works in solidarity with the struggle for African liberation and the unification of Africa and African people worldwide." The role of the APSC is to raise funds through donation campaigns and to carry out the economic development campaigns of the APSP.

In September 1979, the party founded the African National Prison Organization (ANPO); the decision to form the ANPO was decided following a September 4, 1977 meeting in Atlanta, Georgia. During the meeting, several Black nationalist organizations declared the importance of, and the need for developing greater unity between pro-Black independence and prison forces. It was decided that the ANPO "would be the gateway to building a national liberation front." Additionally, the participants at the meeting established five principles as the basis for forming the ANPO, which were self-determination, political independence, anti-imperialism, anticolonialism, and self-defense.

In 1981, the party moved its national office from Florida to Oakland, California, and opened the Uhuru house. The first party congress was held in Oakland in 1982. At that congress, the party passed a resolution to create the African Socialist International (ASI) organization. The ASI sought to be the "international party of the African working class", and has held conferences in various countries outside the United States.

The APSP founded the African National Reparations Organization (ANRO) in 1982, and the First World Tribunal on Reparations for African People was held in Brooklyn, New York. On its official website, the APSP claims that "through this work, the African People's Socialist Party gave birth to the modern Reparations Movement." Authors Michael T. Martin and Marilyn Yaquinto however posit that, in the National Black Political Assembly's (NBPA) Black Agenda report published in 1974, the NBPA first "endorsed the concept of African American reparations." Citing Ida Hakim (Hakim, I. T., Reparations, the Cure for America's Race Problem. Hampton. Va.; U.B. and U.S. Communication System, 1994), the authors however went on to write that: "The African National Reparations Organization linked to the African People's Socialist Party has conducted yearly tribunals on U.S. racism since 1982 and demanded $4.1 trillion in reparations for stolen labor." That financial reparation was initially demanded at the First World Tribunal on Reparations for African People's 1982 meeting, which concluded that, "the United States owned $4.1 trillion for the crime of genocide against African Americans and the unpaid labor provided by them and their descendants during the period of slavery." The stated objective of the movement is to obtain compensation for the injustices of slavery, as well as segregation and neocolonialism since then.

In the mid-1990s, the party's national office moved back to St. Petersburg, Florida.

The APSP and its sister organization the Uhuru Movement were investigated by state prosecutors for allegedly collaborating with alleged Russian foreign agent Aleksandr Viktorovich Ionov to sow social divisions in the United States. Members of the APSP and Uhuru Movement have traveled to St. Petersburg, Russia to attend an anti-globalization conference hosted by Russia. The organization supports Russia in its ongoing invasion of Ukraine.

The Colorado Times Recorder indicated that the African People's Socialist Party is linked to another group under investigation for ties to Russia, the Black Hammer Party, by way of Gazi Kodzo (referred to by the publication as "August Romaine Jr.") who had previously been a key member in both organizations.

References

External links
The Bridge, A Day of Reparations Stops in Portland by Rory Elliott, November 21, 2018  (Retrieved 19 April 2019)

1972 establishments in Florida
African Americans' rights organizations
African socialist political parties
African-American socialism
Black political parties in the United States
Communist parties in the United States
Black separatism
Pan-Africanism in the United States
Pan-Africanist political parties
Political parties established in 1972
Socialist parties in the United States
Political parties in Florida
State and local socialist parties in the United States
Organizations based in St. Petersburg, Florida
Russia–United States relations